The 2007 1000km of Spa was the fourth automobile endurance round for Le Mans Prototype and Le Mans Grand Touring vehicles of the 2007 Le Mans Series season.  It took place at the Circuit de Spa-Francorchamps, Belgium, on 19 August 2007.

Official results
Class winners in bold.  Cars failing to complete 70% of winner's distance marked as Not Classified (NC).

† - Shinji Nakano was excluded from the results of the race for avoidable contact with another car.

Statistics
 Pole Position - #7 Team Peugeot Total - 2:00.105
 Fastest Lap - #8 Team Peugeot Total - 2:03.316
 Average Speed - 172.790 km/h

References

External links
 Le Mans Series 2007 - Spa

S
6 Hours of Spa-Francorchamps
1000km